Francis Kellogg may refer to:

 Francis William Kellogg (1810–1879), U.S. Representative from the states of Michigan and Alabama
 Francis L. Kellogg (1917–2006), American diplomat